The Prager Presse (Prague press) was a German newspaper published in the Czechoslovak Republic from March 1921 to 1939.

History 
The newspaper Prager Presse was founded by Tomáš Garrigue Masaryk with the aim of integrating the German-speaking minority, which at that time had a share of 22.5% of the population. Arne Laurin was editor from 1921 to 1938.

References 

Newspapers published in Prague
Defunct newspapers published in Czechoslovakia
1921 establishments in Czechoslovakia
Newspapers established in 1921
German-language newspapers published in Czechoslovakia
Sudeten German people
German Bohemian people
Jewish Czech history
20th century in Prague
Publications disestablished in 1939
1939 disestablishments in Czechoslovakia